Saxon is the debut studio album by English heavy metal band Saxon, released in 1979.

Reception

Eduardo Rivadavia of AllMusic gave the album three stars out of five, and, in his mixed review, described it as "the quiet before the storm", in terms of the band's subsequent success, and the rising New Wave of British Heavy Metal. Rivadavia also criticized the band's then-lack of experience in the studio as well as their record label, Carrere, for not knowing "how to capture a heavy metal sound on tape", meaning that the album "only hints at Saxon's true personality, power, and songwriting potential". He also said that the progressive rock sounding "Rainbow Theme"/"Frozen Rainbow" and glam rock sounding "Big Teaser" and "Still Fit to Boogie", "suggested some lingering doubts as to musical direction", but that, overall, "the LP helped to put Saxon on the map". Canadian journalist Martin Popoff judged the album "meekly recorded and timid in execution", harkening back to "too many '70s styles, ones that barely fit together" with merely hints of the "more uncompromising forms of metal" Saxon would produce in later years.

Track listing

Bonus tracks 14–18, Recorded 1980-01-23, Tommy Vance's Friday Rock Show, transmitted 15 February 1980.
Bonus tracks 20-22 recorded live at Donington, 1980.

Personnel
Saxon
Biff Byford – vocals
Graham Oliver – guitar
Paul Quinn – guitar
Steve Dawson – bass guitar
Pete Gill – drums

Production
 John Verity – producer, engineer
 Robert Price – Tape Operator
 Livingstone Studios, UK – recording and mixing location

References

Saxon (band) albums
1979 debut albums
Carrere Records albums